Slavery in Libya has a long history and a lasting impact on the Libyan culture. It is closely connected with the wider context of slavery in North African and trans-Saharan slave trade.

History

Enslavement of Europeans

It is estimated that between 1 million and 1.25 million Europeans were captured by pirates and sold as slaves between the 16th and 19th century. Reports of Barbary raids and kidnappings of those in Italy, France, Iberia, England, Ireland, Scotland and as far north as Iceland exist from this period. Famous accounts of Barbary slave raids include a mention in the Diary of Samuel Pepys and a raid on the coastal village of Baltimore, Ireland, during which pirates left with the entire populace of the settlement. Such raids in the Mediterranean were so frequent and devastating that the coastline between Venice and Malaga suffered widespread depopulation, and settlement there was discouraged. It was said that this was largely because "there was no one left to capture any longer".

Enslavement of West & Central Africans

The Tuareg and others who are indigenous to Libya facilitated, taxed and partly organized the trade from the south along the trans-Saharan trade routes. In the 1830s – a period when slave trade flourished – Ghadames was handling 2,500 slaves a year. Even though the slave trade was officially abolished in Tripoli in 1853, in practice it continued.

The British Consul in Benghazi wrote in 1875 that the slave trade had reached an enormous scale and that the slaves who were sold in Alexandria and Constantinople had quadrupled in price. This trade, he wrote, was encouraged by the local government.

Adolf Vischer writes in an article published in 1911 that: "...it has been said that slave traffic is still going on on the Benghazi-Wadai route, but it is difficult to test the truth of such an assertion as, in any case, the traffic is carried on secretly". At Kufra, the Egyptian traveller Ahmed Hassanein Bey found out in 1916 that he could buy a girl slave for five pounds sterling while in 1923 he found that the price had risen to 30 to 40 pounds sterling.

Another traveler, the Danish convert to Islam Knud Holmboe, crossed the Italian Libyan desert in 1930, and was told that slavery is still practiced in Kufra and that he could buy a slave girl for 30 pounds sterling at the Thursday slave market. According to James Richardson's testimony, when he visited Ghadames, most slaves were from Bornu.

21st century

Human Rights Watch documented cases of migrants frequently being arbitrarily detained and sold in Libyan detention centers. Amnesty International also noted that migrants traveling through Libya were subject to detention in overcrowded and unhygienic conditions, and torture. The US state department also noted in their 2010 report on human trafficking: "As in previous years, there were isolated reports that women from West and Central Africa were forced into prostitution in Libya. There were also reports that migrants from Georgia were subjected to forced labor in Libya," and argued that the Libyan government did not show significant evidence of effort to prosecute traffickers or protect trafficking victims.

Slavery in the post-Gaddafi era 
Since Muammar Gaddafi's regime was overthrown during the First Libyan Civil War in 2011, Libya has been plagued by disorder, leaving migrants with little cash and no papers vulnerable. Libya is a major exit point for African migrants heading to Europe. The International Organization for Migration (IOM) published a report in April 2017 showing that many of the migrants from West, Central and Sahelian Africa heading to Europe are sold as slaves after being detained by people smugglers or militia groups. African countries south of Libya were targeted for slave trading and transferred to Libyan slave markets instead. According to the victims, the price is higher for migrants with skills like painting and tiling. Slaves are often ransomed to their families and until ransom can be paid are tortured, forced to work, sometimes to death and eventually executed or left to starve if they can't pay for too long. Women are often raped and used as sex slaves and sold to brothels and private Libyan clients. Many child migrants also suffer from abuse and child rape in Libya.

After receiving unverified CNN video of a November 2017 slave auction in Libya, a human trafficker told Al-Jazeera that hundreds of migrants are bought and sold across the country every week. Migrants who have gone through Libyan detention centres have shown signs of many human rights abuses such as severe abuse, including electric shocks, burns, lashes and even skinning, stated the director of health services on the Italian island of Lampedusa  to Euronews.

A Libyan group known as the Asma Boys have antagonized migrants from other parts of Africa from at least as early as 2000, destroying their property. Nigerian migrants in January 2018 gave accounts of abuses in detention centres, including being leased or sold as slaves. Videos of Sudanese migrants being burnt and whipped for ransom, were released later on by their families on social media. In June 2018, the United Nations applied sanctions against four Libyans (including a Coast Guard commander) and two Eritreans for their criminal leadership of slave trade networks.

Reactions
The governments of Burkina Faso and the Democratic Republic of the Congo responded to the reports by recalling their ambassadors from Libya. The CNN report incited outrage. Hundreds of protesters, mostly young black people, protested in front of the Libyan embassy in central Paris, with French police firing tear gas to disperse them. Moussa Faki Mahamat, chairman of the African Union Commission, called the auctions "despicable". Protests also took place outside Libyan embassies in Bamako, Conakry and Yaounde. UN Secretary-General António Guterres stated that he was horrified by the auction footage and these crimes should be investigated as possible crimes against humanity. Hundreds protested outside the Libyan Embassy on 9 December in London.

President of Niger Mahamadou Issoufou summoned the Libyan ambassador and demanded the International Court of Justice to investigate Libya for slave trade. Foreign minister of Burkina Faso Alpha Barry also stated he had summoned the Libyan ambassador for consultations. France on 22 November sought an emergency meeting of UN Security Council, while President Emmanuel Macron called the footage "scandalous" and "unacceptable." He called the auctions a crime against humanity. President of Nigeria Muhammadu Buhari stated that Nigerians were being treated like goats and stated stranded Nigerian migrants in Libya will be brought back.

The African Union, European Union and United Nations agreed on 30 November to set up a task force in Libya against migrant abuse. The task force's aim is to coordinate its work with the GNA to dismantle trafficking and criminal networks. It also aims to help countries of origin and transit hubs to tackle migration with development and stability. African and European leaders agreed on the same day to evacuate the migrants trapped in camps.
Former Nigerian aviation minister Femi Fani-Kayode published images on Twitter claiming that slaves were having their organs harvested and some of their bodies are burnt. He also quoted a report claiming that 75% of the slaves are from southern Nigeria. It was unclear however whether his images were authentic.

A Ghanaian lawyer, Bobby Banson, also claimed that the organs of the migrants were being harvested and they were not being sold for work. He requested African Union to set up an ad-hoc committee to investigate the slave trade.

In 2017, the progressive media watchdog organization FAIR accused the mainstream media in Western nations of whitewashing the role NATO and the United States played in the resurgence of open slave markets in Libya, following the NATO-led ousting of Muammar Qadhafi in 2011.

NCHRL accusations of exaggerated reporting
In November 2017, the National Commission for Human Rights in Libya (NCHRL) claimed that the media reports of slavery in Libya were exaggerated, and that while slavery existed in Libya, it was also rare as well. Slave auctions, the commission said, are "such rare sights" and "are very discrete and clandestine". The commission also called for the Libyan government to stamp out the illegal practice of slavery as well.

See also

 African slave trade
 Human trafficking in Libya
 Slavery in modern Africa
 Islamic views on slavery
 Afro Arab
 Slavery in the Ottoman Empire
 2011 military intervention in Libya
 Timeline of abolition of slavery and serfdom

References

Society of Libya
History of Libya by topic
Libya
Racism in Libya
Anti-black racism in Africa
Human rights abuses in Libya
Human commodity auctions